Boylan Heights is the second album by the American pop/rock band the Connells. It was released in 1987, and was their first for TVT Records. The title of the album references the historic Boylan Heights neighborhood of Raleigh, North Carolina.

Production
The album was recorded at Drive-In Studio, and was produced by Mitch Easter.

Critical reception
AllMusic praised the album as an improvement on the previous effort, noting the influences of Southern rock and Celtic rock.  Trouser Press wrote that "the band has matured into a distinctive enough unit to do justice to Michael’s yearning collegiate considerations of love, war and alienation." MusicHound Rock: The Essential Album Guide deemed Boylan Heights "one of the most distinctive college rock albums of the '80s." The Orlando Sentinel called it "a collection of warmly energetic and melodic rockers."

Track listing
All songs by Mike Connell, except "Home Today" by George Huntley.

 "Scotty's Lament" - 3:24
 "Choose A Side" - 3:44
 "Try" - 3:17
 "Just Like Us"- 3:28
 "If It Crumbles" - 3:43
 "Pawns" - 3:24
 "Over There" - 3:29
 "Elegance" - 3:40
 "Home Today" - 3:28
 "OT² (Instrumental)" - 2:52
 "I Suppose" - 4:50

Personnel 
The Connells
 Doug MacMillan - lead vocals
 Mike Connell - guitar, backing vocals
 George Huntley - guitar, backing vocals, keyboards; lead vocals on "Home Today"
 David Connell - bass
 Peele Wimberley - drums

Additional personnel
 Mitch Easter - producer
 Bill Spencer - trumpet
 Angie Carlson - Hammond organ
 Molly Leach - design
 Lane Smith - illustration
 Steve Wilson - photography

References

The Connells albums
1987 albums
Albums produced by Mitch Easter
TVT Records albums